Events from the year 1930 in art.

Events
 June–July – Christopher Wood paints in Brittany.
 29 November – Première of the Surrealist film L'Age d'Or by Luis Buñuel (co-written with Salvador Dalí) at Studio 28 in Paris.
 Theo van Doesburg produces a "Manifesto of Concrete art".
 Vanessa Bell and Duncan Grant complete the decoration of the dining room for Dorothy Wellesley at Penns-in-the-Rocks, Withyham, England.
 Malvina Hoffman begins sculpting life-size figures for the Field Museum's Hall of Man.
 Great Bardfield Artists community established in England.
 Bernard Berenson publishes The Italian Painters of the Renaissance.
 Milt Gross publishes his wordless novel He Done Her Wrong in the United States.
 Soviet sale of Hermitage paintings begins.
 Spanish postage stamps depict Goya's La maja desnuda.
 Approximate date – Gertrud Arndt begins a series of photographic self-portraits at the Bauhaus.

Awards
 Archibald Prize: W. B. McInnes – Drum-Major Harry McClelland

Exhibitions
 April – Cercle et Carré exhibition opens at Galerie 23 in the Rue La Boétie, Paris.

Works

 Edward Bawden and Eric Ravilious – Mural in refectory of Morley College, London (begun 1928; destroyed in The Blitz 1940)
 Pierre Bonnard – Pots
 Patrick Henry Bruce – Peinture (Museum of Modern Art, New York)
 Edward Burra – The Snack Bar
 John Steuart Curry – Hogs Killing a Snake
 Theo van Doesburg – Arithmetic Composition
 M. C. Escher
 The Bridge (lithograph)
 Castrovalva (lithograph)
 Palizzi, Calabria (woodcut)
 Pentedattilo, Calabria (lithograph)
 Street in Scanno, Abruzzi (lithograph)
 Thomas Cooper Gotch – The Exile: Heavy Is The Price I Paid For Love
 James Guthrie – Statesmen of World War I
 Edward Hopper – Early Sunday Morning
 Augustus John – Portrait of Tallulah Bankhead
 Rozsa Klein (Rogi André) – Bonnard's Palette
 Helmut Kolle
 Self-Portrait in Hunting Attire
 Young Man with a Colored Scarf
 Abel Lafleur – Victory (trophy)
 Fernand Léger – Mona Lisa with Keys
 L. S. Lowry – Coming from the Mill
 Jeanne Mammen – Free Room
 Henri Matisse – The Back Series (bas-reliefs)
 Alice Neel – Ethel Ashton (nude portrait)
 José Clemente Orozco – Prometheus (fresco at Pomona College, California)
 Charles Sheeler – American Landscape
 T. F. Šimon – View in Old Prague (woodcut)
 Grace Cossington Smith – The Bridge in Curve
 Herbert Tyson Smith – bronze reliefs for Liverpool Cenotaph
 Sophie Taeuber-Arp – Composition of Circles and Overlapping Angles
 Edward Trumbull – Transport and Human Endeavor (ceiling mural, lobby, Chrysler Building, New York City)
 Christopher Wood
 Anemones in a Cornish Window
 Zebra and Parachute
 Grant Wood
 American Gothic
 Stone City, Iowa
 W. L. Wyllie – Panorama of the Battle of Trafalgar (Royal Naval Museum, Portsmouth)
 Xu Beihong – A Portrait of Sun Duoci
 Statler Fountain

Births

January to June
 15 January – Paul Ahyi, Togolese artist and sculptor (d. 2010)
 26 January – Napoleon Abueva, Filipino sculptor (d. 2018)
 3 February – Gillian Ayres, English abstract painter (d. 2018)
 10 February – Eva Frankfurther, German-born portrait painter (suicide 1959)
 13 February – Ernst Fuchs, Austrian artist (d. 2015)
 18 February – Gahan Wilson, American cartoonist (d. 2019)
 21 February – Enrique Tábara, Ecuadorian painter (d. 2021)
 24 February – Anita Steckel, American feminist artist (d. 2012)
 25 February – Wendy Beckett, English contemplative nun and art historian (d. 2018)
 7 March – Antony Armstrong-Jones, English photographer (d. 2017)
 8 March – Hector Lombana, Colombian sculptor, painter and architect (d. 2008)
 11 March – David Gentleman, English graphic designer
 27 March – Daniel Spoerri, Romanian-Swiss artist and writer
 30 March – Rolf Harris, Australian entertainer, painter and child sexual abuser
 31 March – Susan Weil, American painter
 1 April – John Houston, Scottish painter (d. 2008)
 12 April – Manuel Neri, American sculptor, painter and printmaker (d. 2021)
 14 May – James Beck, American art historian (d. 2007)
 15 May – Jasper Johns, American painter, sculptor and printmaker
 22 May – Marisol Escobar, French-born sculptor and printmaker (d.2016)
 23 May
 Richard Anuszkiewicz, American painter, sculptor and printmaker (d. 2020)
 Aslan, French-born pin-up artist (d.2014)
 24 May – Unity Spencer, English artist (d. 2017)
 30 May – Robert Ryman, American monochrome painter (d. 2019)
 5 June – Vladimir Popov, Soviet animator, animation and art director (d. 1987)
 15 June – Ikuo Hirayama, Japanese painter (d. 2009)
 16 June – Allan D'Arcangelo, American painter and graphic artist (d. 1998)
 19 June – Bryan Kneale, Manx sculptor and academic
 20 June – Magdalena Abakanowicz, Polish sculptor (d. 2017)
 24 June 
Pierre Restany, French art critic and cultural philosopher (d. 2003)
Flip Schulke, American photojournalist (d. 2008)

July to December
 4 July – Mohamed Demagh, Algerian sculptor (d. 2018)
 4 August - Astrid Zydower, German-born British sculptor (d. 2005) 
 5 September – Ibrahim El-Salahi, Sudanese painter
 28 September – Nikolai Pozdneev, Russian painter (d. 1978)
 3 October – Robyn Denny, British abstract artist (d. 2014)
 7 October – Kurt Dornis, German painter, graphic artist and draughtsman
 8 October – Faith Ringgold, African American painter and fabric artist
 18 October – Trevor Bell, English painter (d. 2017)
 29 October – Niki de Saint Phalle, French sculptor, painter and film maker (d. 2002)
 7 November – Robert Natkin, American painter (d. 2010)
 13 November – Benny Andrews, American painter and academic (d. 2006)
 14 November – Elisabeth Frink, English sculptor (d. 1993)
 31 December – Luis Marsans, Catalan painter (d. 2015)

Deaths
 January 7 – Max Schmalzl, German religious painter and illustrator (b. 1850)
 March 3 – W. W. Quatremain, English landscape painter (b. 1857)
 March 19 – Andreas Walser, Swiss painter (b. 1908)
 March 24 – Eugeen Van Mieghem, Belgian painter (b. 1875)
 April 17 – Aleksandr Golovin, Russian stage designer (b. 1863)
 April 30 – John Russell, Australian Impressionist painter (b. 1858)
 May 10 – Julio Romero de Torres, Spanish painter (b. 1874)
 May 28 – George Washington Lambert, Australian portrait painter and war artist (b. 1873)
 June 3 – Alexander Bogomazov, Ukrainian painter and modern art theoretician of Russian avant-garde (b. 1880)
 June 5 
 Sophie Holten, Danish painter (b. 1858)
 Jules Pascin, Bulgarian-born painter and draftsman (b. 1885)
 July 22 – Wacław Szymanowski, Polish sculptor and painter (b. 1859)
 August 21 – Christopher Wood, English painter (b. 1901) (suicide)
 August 28 – Stanisław Bergman, Polish painter (b. 1862)
 September 6 – Sir James Guthrie, Scottish painter (b. 1859)
 September 24 – Otto Mueller, German Expressionist painter (b. 1874)
 September 25 – Abram Arkhipov, Russian painter (b. 1862)
 September 29 – Ilya Yefimovich Repin, Russian painter (b. 1844)
 December 9 – Laura Muntz Lyall, Canadian Impressionist painter (b. 1860)
 December 17 – Nikolay Kasatkin, Russian painter (b. 1859)
 December 28 – Antonio Mancini, Italian painter (b. 1852)
 date unknown – Peter Moog, outsider artist (b. 1871)

See also
 1930 in fine arts of the Soviet Union

References

 
Years of the 20th century in art
1930s in art